Andrés Rodríguez (born 27 June 1985) is a Panamanian male track and field sprinter who competes in the 200 metres and 400 metres. He holds personal bests of 21.30 seconds and 47.02 seconds, respectively. He is the shared holder of two Panamanian national records, having set 4 × 100 metres relay and 4 × 400 metres relay records in 2007.

He has represented his country four times at the South American Championships in Athletics and twice at the Central American and Caribbean Games. He has also participated at the World Youth Championships in Athletics and the World Junior Championships in Athletics. He has won multiple medals at Central American level, including a 400 m gold medal in 2008.

International competitions

References

External links

Living people
1985 births
Panamanian male sprinters
Central American Games silver medalists for Panama
Central American Games medalists in athletics
Competitors at the 2006 Central American and Caribbean Games
Competitors at the 2014 Central American and Caribbean Games